Vincenzo de' Rossi  (b. Fiesole, 1525. d. Florence, 1587) was an Italian sculptor.

Work 

Rossi was mentored by Baccio Bandinelli.

Many of Rossi's works historically were incorrectly attributed to Michelangelo, such as Dying Adonis.

Some of his most famous works were his sculptures of the Twelve Labours of Hercules, of which he only completed seven. Six of these sculptures are located in at the Palazzo Vecchio. The seventh labour, Hercules with Atlas, is located at the Villa di Poggio Imperiale.

References 

16th-century Italian sculptors
1525 births
1587 deaths
Sculptors from Florence